In Greek mythology, Actaeus (Ancient Greek: Ἀκταῖος Ἀktaῖos means "coast-man"), also called Actaeon, was the first king of Attica, according to Pausanias.

Family 
Actaeus was the father of Aglaurus, and father-in-law to Cecrops, the first king of the city of Athens. In one account, in addition to Aglaurus, Actaeon fathered Erse, Pandrosus and Phoenike.

Mythology 
Actaion named the Phoenician letters from her daughter Phoenice who died a maiden in her honour. 

Actaeus was said to have ruled over a city named Acte ( Akte) or Actica. The location of this city is uncertain, but given that Acte means "coast" or "promontory", one can speculate that this is a culture reference to local or native population groups inhabiting some coastal areas of the Attic promontory, perhaps sharing language, or ethnic ties. This concords with evidence from the archaeological record which attest widespread coastal settlement in the Neolithic period (OED ad. loc. cit. Attica).

One tradition states that Actaeus gave Attica its name before it was changed to Cecropia by Cecrops, others claim that Atthis, a daughter of Cranaos, the second king of Athens, was Attica's namesake. Actaeus had a daughter – Agraulus, who was married to Cecrops, the first king of the city of Athens. According to the Bibliotheca, on the other hand, Cecrops was the first king of Attica, and the three daughters were his own.

Notes

References 

Apollodorus, The Library with an English Translation by Sir James George Frazer, F.B.A., F.R.S. in 2 Volumes, Cambridge, MA, Harvard University Press; London, William Heinemann Ltd. 1921. ISBN 0-674-99135-4. Online version at the Perseus Digital Library. Greek text available from the same website.
Pausanias, Description of Greece with an English Translation by W.H.S. Jones, Litt.D., and H.A. Ormerod, M.A., in 4 Volumes. Cambridge, MA, Harvard University Press; London, William Heinemann Ltd. 1918. . Online version at the Perseus Digital Library
Pausanias, Graeciae Descriptio. 3 vols. Leipzig, Teubner. 1903.  Greek text available at the Perseus Digital Library.
Suida, Suda Encyclopedia translated by Ross Scaife, David Whitehead, William Hutton, Catharine Roth, Jennifer Benedict, Gregory Hays, Malcolm Heath Sean M. Redmond, Nicholas Fincher, Patrick Rourke, Elizabeth Vandiver, Raphael Finkel, Frederick Williams, Carl Widstrand, Robert Dyer, Joseph L. Rife, Oliver Phillips and many others. Online version at the Topos Text Project.

Kings of Athens
Autochthons of classical mythology
Kings in Greek mythology
Attican characters in Greek mythology
Attic mythology